Ormoc (IPA: [ʔoɾˈmok]), officially the City of Ormoc, is a 1st class independent component city in the Eastern Visayas region of the Philippines. According to the 2020 census, it has a population of 230,998 inhabitants, making it the second most-populous city in the province of Leyte after the provincial capital of Tacloban. Ormoc is the economic, cultural, commercial and transportation hub of western Leyte.

Ormoc is an independent component city, not subject to regulation from the Provincial Government of Leyte. However, the city is part of the 4th Congressional District of Leyte together with Albuera, Kananga, Merida, Palompon and Isabel, and statistically grouped under the province by the Philippine Statistics Authority. On November 8, 2013, the city was extensively damaged by Super Typhoon Yolanda (Haiyan), having previously suffered severe destruction and loss of life in 1991 from torrential flooding during Tropical Storm Thelma (Uring).

The city's name is derived from ogmok, an archaic Visayan term for "lowland" or "depressed plain". The city also celebrates an annual thanksgiving festival called the Piña Festival in honor of the saints Peter and Paul in thanks for the bountiful pineapple harvest.

History

Early History 
This place was used during the Spanish occupation and the migration of the neighboring towns to settle in the more fertile plains of Ormoc. Much of the settler in the town were the Malayans. These people had a constant trading with the Chinese, Javans and Indonesians.  Their living, however, was always threatened by the attack of the Moro pirates. It is said that the people in Ormoc developed a warning system communication through people manning watch towers to inform and warn the people of the coming of these pirates.

Spanish Period 
July 16, 1595, Jesuit missionaries arrived in Leyte. On May 1507, a mission in Ormoc was established by these missionaries. That year, the locals were converted to Christianity. Their years of peace was shortly felt when in year 1634, a ruler of Sulu by the name of Raja Bungsu captured 300 natives form Ormoc after the invasion of the notorious pirates in the town. The towns of Sogod, Kabalian, Inopacan and Baybay were also invaded and plundered. More locals of Ormoc still fought this Raja and his men but because they were outnumbered, they were massacred up to the last man.

Philippine Revolution 
Ormoc is a hotbed of revolutionaries seeking independence from Spanish rule. The revolutionary leader Faustino Alben inspired locals to join the Pulahan Movement.

World War II 

After the Japanese Occupation and a rule of Second Philippine Republic. Ormoc is a garrison of small divisions of the Imperial Japanese Army. With the Allies near the City. Japan begin to reinforce the city and the Battle of Ormoc Bay begins. The city is liberated afterwards.

Cityhood 

Ormoc became a city by virtue of Republic Act No. 179 on October 20, 1947, becoming the fifteenth city in the Philippines and the first in the Eastern Visayas region.

Kananga was created in 1950 from the barrios of Lonoy, Kananga, Rizal, Tugbong, Montebello, Aguiting, Tagaytay, Montealegre, Libungao, Naghalin, and Masarayao which all used to be part of Ormoc City.

1991 Flash Flood

On the morning of November 5, 1991, the Ormoc region was inundated by Tropical Storm Uring. The city government recorded 4,922 deaths, 3,000 missing persons, 14,000 destroyed houses and more than P600 million worth of damaged property. None of the 3,000 missing persons were ever found and are now presumed dead. Illegal logging and kaingin (slash-and-burn farming) were blamed as the reasons of the flood. Heavy rainfall caused water to collect upstream the Anilao and Malbasag rivers until it poured to the lowlands in Ormoc, particularly District 26, also known as Isla Verde.

On November 5, 2011, a monument by national artist Francis Cinco commemorating the 20th anniversary of the event was inaugurated. It sits on top of the mass grave at the Ormoc City Public Cemetery where an estimated 4,900 victims are buried. The sculpture, entitled "Gift of Life", is an abstract depicting a life taken to heaven.

2013 Super Typhoon Haiyan 

On November 7, 2013, Typhoon Haiyan, one of the most powerful tropical cyclones ever recorded, made a landfall in the Philippines. While it killed far fewer people as Tropical Storm Uring, it left widespread devastation to the city with destruction and damages in 90% of its structures.

2022 plebiscite
On January 19, 2021, the City Council enacted Ordinance 52 Series of 2021 to merge the numbered barangays (all in Poblacion) and renaming them:
 Barangays 1–8, 12, 13, 15, 17, 23 & 27 shall be merged to form a single unit to be named as Barangay South;
 Brgys. 9–11, 16, 18, 25 & 28 as Brgy. East;
 Brgys. 14, 19–22, 24 & 26 as Brgy. West; and
 Brgy. 29 will be renamed as Brgy. North.
The ordinance require a plebiscite and the determination of an affirmation will be based on the majority vote of the proposed administrative subdivision and not a majority vote per barangay. This is to avoid creation of enclaves and exclaves. Then mayor Richard Gomez approved the ordinance on January 22, 2021. On June 22, 2022, the  Commission on Elections through Resolution No. 10796 set the plebiscite on October 8.

The plebiscite was held at the Ormoc City Central School, with 35 polling precincts, wherein 10,209 registered voters from 29 barangays were expected to participate. With a voter turnout of more than half, majority of them approved the reorganization.

Geography
Ormoc City is a port city and is the largest city in Leyte by land area and the second-largest in Eastern Visayas after Calbayog in Samar. At the head of Ormoc Bay, the city's terrain is mostly of gently rolling plains. It is bounded on the northwest by the towns of Matag-ob and Merida, in the north by Kananga and Carigara, in the northeast by the towns of Jaro, Pastrana and Dagami, and in the south by the town of Albuera. High mountain ranges separate Ormoc from the eastern portion of Leyte. Numerous rivers and streams traverse Ormoc. Among them are the Bao River in the north, Pagsangahan River in the west, the Bagong-bong River in the south, the Panilahan River also in the south and the Anilao and Malbasag Rivers which border the eastern and western flanks of Ormoc City Proper.

Barangays
Ormoc is politically subdivided into 85 barangays at present. The number had reduced from 110 upon ratification of an ordinance merging 29 of them to four.

 Airport
 Alegria
 Alta Vista
 Bagongbong
 Bagong Buhay
 Bantigue
 Batuan
 Bayog
 Biliboy
 Cabaon-an
 Cabintan
 Cabulihan
 Cagbuhangin
 Camp Downes
 Can-adieng
 Can-untog
 Catmon
 Cogon Combado
 Concepcion
 Curva
 Danhug (Lili-on)
 Dayhagan
 Dolores
 Domonar
 Don Carlos B. Rivilla Sr. (Boroc)
 Don Felipe Larrazabal
 Don Potenciano Larrazabal
 Doña Feliza Z. Mejia
 Donghol
 East (Poblacion; consisting former Brgys. District 9–11, 16, 18, 25 (Malbasag), 28)
 Esperanza
 Gaas
 Green Valley
 Guintigui-an
 Hibunawon
 Hugpa
 Ipil
 Juaton
 Kadaohan
 Labrador (Balion)
 Lake Danao
 Lao
 Leondoni
 Libertad
 Liberty
 Licuma
 Liloan
 Linao
 Luna
 Mabato
 Mabini
 Macabug
 Magaswi
 Mahayag
 Mahayahay
 Manlilinao
 Margen
 Mas-in
 Matica-a
 Milagro
 Monterico
 Nasunogan
 Naungan
 North (Poblacion; consisting former Brgy. District 29 (Nadongholan))
 Nueva Sociedad
 Nueva Vista
 Patag
 Punta
 Quezon, Jr.
 Rufina M. Tan (Rawis)
 Sabang Bao
 Salvacion
 San Antonio
 San Isidro
 San Jose
 San Juan
 San Pablo (Simangan)
 San Vicente
 Santo Niño
 South (Poblacion; consisting former Brgys. District 1–8, 12, 13, 15, 17, 23, 27)
 Sumangga
 Tambulilid
 Tongonan
 Valencia
 West (Poblacion; consisting former Brgys. District 14, 19–22, 24, 26 (Isla Verde))

Climate

Demographics

The natives of this city are called Ormocanons, with most being Cebuano speakers, as with the whole western and southern parts of the island of Leyte. A definite number of Waray speakers is also present within the city.

Like most Filipinos, Ormocanons are predominantly Roman Catholic, and the city celebrates its annual fiesta in honour of the patron saints Saint Peter and Saint Paul on June 28 and 29. Other main Catholic holy days, including the local fiestas of barangays, are observed throughout the year. There is also a visible Muslim minority within the city and all over the island, evidenced by the mosques within the cityscape and most of them are Maranaos from the twin provinces of Lanao del Norte and Lanao del Sur in Mindanao.

Economy

Ormoc's economic base is a mix of agriculture, aquaculture, industry, tourism, and commercial services. Sugar cane, rice and pineapple are the major agricultural production.

The city enjoys economic growth because it supplies a large part of the country's power needs with its abundant geothermal power resources from the Tongonan Geothermal Power Plant in Barangay Tongonan and the neighbouring Kananga town. Ormoc is also the gateway to the Leyte Industrial Development Estate in the nearby town of Isabel, home of the Philippine Phosphate Fertilizer Plant, the largest fertilizer factory in Asia, and the Philippine Associated Smelter and Refining Company, the country's biggest copper processing plant, among other industries.

Tourism 

Among sites visited by the city's tourist are:
 Lake Danao is a violin shaped lake 3 km long at an elevation of 2,100 feet (640 m) above sea level. There are floating cottages, and boats are available for hire and a future zipline. Lake Danao was formerly called as Lake Imelda. On February 3, 1998, it was renamed and declared as Lake Danao National Park and is protected by the National Integrated Protected Area System Act of 1992.
 Tongonan Hotsprings National Park is located at an elevation of 2,000 ft. amid densely forested hills. It is a 272-hectare park at the west end of the Leyte Mountain Trail, 18 km. northeast of Ormoc City. It also has a cool climate, lush tropical vegetation and underbrush, a warm medicinal pool, a cavernous hillside geyser that spouts boiling water and steam hourly and formations exuding sulfuric vapors. It is a valley of geothermal power source that can supply electricity to the whole region. The first geothermal plant to operate in the Philippines.
 Pineapple Plantation lies in 210 hectares in rolling terrain located north of the city Barangay Hibunawon. Ormoc's Queen Pineapple is famous for its sweetness, a favourite pasalubong, and the unofficial icon of the city. The plantation is owned by the Locsins (family of the city vice mayor). Ormoc is known for its famous “Queen Pineapple." 
 Centennial Park The Veteran's Park was constructed in early 1990s in honor of the Filipino soldiers who fought for the liberation of Leyte and the Philippines. The Centennial Marker was erected in 1998 to commemorate the 100th year of Philippine independence.The park is located in the city, it is a leisure and picnic ground for the young and old alike.
 Lake Kasudsuran is just one of the three beautiful lakes of Ormoc. It is located at Barangay Gaas, Ormoc City in Leyte. The 5-hectare Lake Kasudsuran is located 27 km (a 45-hr. drive) northeast of Ormoc City on the virgin forest of Barangay Ga-as and Mt. Janagdan, a plateau 1,000 m above sea level. The lake is only accessible by foot. Lake Kasudsuran is also a place to explore in Ormoc City.
 Alto Peak is known as the highest mountain in Eastern Visayas(Region VIII). The domain is also a home to farming communities that has vegetable plantations, etc. It is also known as Mt. Amindueuen and is technically part of the Municipality of Jaro, Leyte but its jump off is in Barangay Cabintan, Ormoc City.
 Sayahan Falls The Sayahan Falls is a newly discovered spot that is located at Sitio Maglahug, Barangay Gaas, Ormoc City. The Sayahan Falls started gaining attention when a local tourist uploaded pictures of it in social media and was widely shared.
 Puente dela Reina is known as the oldest bridge in the city. Its cobblestones still intact, relic of an age long gone. It was built in the early 1800s but was completed in 1861. In Spanish era, the bridge was used as docking area for sailboats, vintas of Chinese, Javans and Indonesians who frequented the island to sell their produce. The bridge is still in use to this day.
 Western Leyte Guerrilla Warfare Forces Monument The Monument commemorates the Filipino resistance fighters who fought in the guerilla war against the Japanese occupiers in the Second World War
 Ruins of Cong. Dominador Tan Residence The Tan Mansion Ruins was built during the 1930s. In World War II, the mansion became a Japanese garrison in Leyte. It was destroyed during the bombing of Ormoc before liberation day, known as the “Battle of Ormoc Bay.”The Tan Mansion Ruins is like a memorial to the Japanese that visits the place. Treated like a shrine as it has a significant part of history of both countries—Japan and Philippines. It serves as a monument representing not only Dominador's young love but also as witness to Ormoc's history.

Infrastructure

Transport

The Port of Ormoc serves as the seaport of the city. For air transport, Ormoc Airport serves the city, although no regular commercial flights fly to this airport. Daniel Z. Romualdez Airport in Tacloban is the closest airport with commercial flights.

Energy
Ormoc hosts the biggest power plant in Southeast Asia - the Tongonan Geothermal Power in Barangay Tongonan which supplies electricity not only in the Eastern Visayas Region but power demand in Luzon and Mindanao as well.

Education 

Ormoc is the educational center for western Leyte. It has a range of primary and secondary schools, both public and private. Tertiary education was originally offered by Saint Peter's College of Ormoc, a Benedictine-run Catholic college and the oldest, followed by Western Leyte College of Ormoc City, Inc., a private non-sectarian college. In the 1980s-1990s, the city saw the establishment of Santo Niño College of Ormoc, Saint Paul's School of Ormoc Foundation, Inc. and the STI College - Ormoc. In the 2000s, tertiary institutions founded were ACLC College of Ormoc, San Lorenzo Ruiz College of Ormoc, Ormoc City Institute of Technology (OCIT) and the Ormoc campus of the Eastern Visayas State University.

Ormoc also has their own Chinese school which is Ormoc Se San School.

Notable personalities

Johnriel Casimero - professional boxer
Monica Cuenco - singer, theater actress
Rey Evangelista - former professional basketball player
Richard Gomez - actor, Ormoc City mayor
Chico Lanete and Garvo Lanete - professional basketball players
Zenaida Monsada - chemist, Department of Energy Officer-in-Charge Secretary
Lucy Torres Gomez - actress, Congresswoman of 4th District, Leyte
Robert Bolick - Professional basketball player
Analyn Barro - Actress

References

External links

 
 [ Philippine Standard Geographic Code]
Philippine Census of Population
Local Governance Performance Management System

 
Cities in Leyte (province)
Independent component cities in the Philippines
Populated places established in 1834
1834 establishments in the Philippines
Port cities and towns in the Philippines